The Kerala Film Critics Association Award for Best Supporting Actress is an award presented annually at the Kerala Film Critics Association Awards. It is given in honour of an actress who has delivered an outstanding performance in a supporting role in a Malayalam film. The award was instituted in 2019 and succeeded the Kerala Film Critics Association Award for Second Best Actress which was awarded between the years 1979 and 2018.

The following list includes the winners of both Best Supporting Actress and Second Best Actress awards.

Second Best Actor (1979 – 2018)

Best Supporting Actor (2019 – present)

References

Supporting Actress
Film awards for supporting actress